Athaiya Mamiya is a 1974 Indian Tamil-language film directed by Chitralaya Gopu, starring Jaishankar and Ushanandini.

Plot 

Shankar (Jaishankar) returns from abroad after successfully completing his higher studies. His parents plan to marry him to one of their relative's daughters. A series of comic incidents ensue while they try to convince Shankar to marry. Things become serious when Shankar reveals to them that he has already met the love of his life, Usha (Ushanandini,) and married her. Angered by this, his father throws him out of his house and Usha joins Shankar to start a new life.

How they succeed in establishing their life is the rest of the movie.

Cast 
 Jaishankar as Shankar
 Ushanandini as Usha
 M. N. Rajam as Sumathi
 Manorama as Manju
 Vennira Aadai Moorthy as Panjabikesan
 Nagesh as Balu
 Sachu as Malathy
 Srikanth as Sarathi
 Gandhimathi as Kattankulathaan's wife
 Thengai Srinivasan as Kattankulathaan
 V. S. Raghavan as Sachinthandham
 Sukumari as Lakshmi
 M. Bhanumathi as Chandra

Soundtrack 
The music was composed by M. S. Viswanathan and lyrics were written by Vaali.

Reception 
Athaiya Mamiya ran in cinemas for 10 weeks.

References

External links 
 

1970s Tamil-language films
1974 films
Films directed by Chitralaya Gopu